NVA is a German comedy film released in 2005 that involves two friends who serve in the National People's Army of the former DDR.  It was directed by Leander Haußmann, who – together with Thomas Brussig – also wrote the screenplay. The film caricatures the life of the National People's Army (abbreviated: NVA) in the final years of East Germany.

Cast
 Kim Alexander Frank - Private Henrik Heidler
 Oliver Bröcker - Private Krüger
 Jasmin Schwiers - Marie Kalt
 Detlev Buck - Colonel  Kalt
 Thorsten Michaelis - Captain Stummel
 Ignaz Kirchner - Warrant Officer Futterknecht
 Maxim Mehmet - Corporal Aurich
 Annika Kuhl - Nurse Sonja
 Robert Gwisdek - Traubewein

External links
 

2005 films
2005 comedy films
German comedy films
Films set in the 1980s
Military humor in film
Films set in East Germany
2000s German films